The Democratic People's Movement  (MPD) was the electoral wing of the Marxist-Leninist Communist Party of Ecuador (affiliated with the ICMLPO-U&S) and a political party in Ecuador since 1978.

At the legislative elections of 20 October 2002, the party won at least 3 out of 100 seats. It again won 3 seats at the 2006 elections, where its presidential candidate Luis Villacis came in 9th place with 1.33% of the vote. In the 2009 National Assembly elections it won 5 out of 124 seats with 4.05% of the vote.

Within 26 years of its founding, the MPD reached 29 national and provincial deputies, a prefect, 33 provincial councilors, 21 mayors and council chairmen, 285 councilors, and 313 parish council members.

The principles of the party can be summarized in its slogan: the "conquest of a popular government, patriotic, democratic, and revolutionary that resolutely applies its program and lays the groundwork for the conquest of socialism."

The MPD was a party with union presence and plays a leading role in the organization of strikes and the politicization of state educational entities through its participation in the National Union of Educators. This has brought it success within the trade unions.

From 9 to 13 July 2007, the MPD and PCMLE jointly organized the XI International Seminar's "Problems of Revolution in Latin America," which was attended by, in addition to the MPD and PCMLE, organizations like the FARC, the Popular Liberation Army of Colombia, the Manuel Rodriguez Patriotic Front of Chile, the Communist Party of Peru - Red Fatherland, and several other organizations in Ecuador, including the Revolutionary Youth of Ecuador, the Federation of University Students of Ecuador, the General Workers Union of Ecuador, and the United Federation of Affiliates for Peasant Social Security.

MPD published Patria Nueva.

Electoral performance

Ecuadorian presidential elections

National Congress elections 

*National assembly election.

See also
 Marxist–Leninist Communist Party of Ecuador

References

External links
Official web site
Patria Nueva

Communist parties in Ecuador
Political parties established in 1978
Plurinational Unity of the Lefts